Mithrobouzanes was the Orontid king of Sophene in the second half of the 2nd-century BC. His name is the Greek transliteration of the Iranian name *MiΘra-bauǰ-ana-, meaning "Delighting Mithra."

He was the son and successor of Zariadres. His reigning period is uncertain; he is attested between 188 and 163 BC. Following Mithrobouzanes' succession, his rule was contested by his brother Artaxias I, who claimed the right to rule over Sophene based on his succession rights (primogeniture). However, Mithrobouzanes managed to preserve the independence of their kingdom, due to their diplomatic (and possibly dynastic) link with Cappadocia. The next known successor of Mithrobouzane was Arkathias.

References

Sources 
 
 

Kings of Sophene
Year of birth unknown
Year of death unknown